Late Shri Akbar Ali Khondkar (Bengali: আকবর আলী খন্দকার) was a Member of Parliament (MP) in the Twelfth Lok Sabha & Thirteenth Lok Sabha of India. He was elected from his Lok Sabha Constituency in Serampore, West Bengal in 1998 and 1999 under All India Trinamool Congress Ticket.

References

India MPs 1999–2004
1957 births
2005 deaths
People from Hooghly district
Trinamool Congress politicians from West Bengal
Lok Sabha members from West Bengal
India MPs 1998–1999
Indian National Congress politicians